Cedric Henderson may refer to:

 Cedric Henderson (basketball, born 1975), American former basketball player, played 1997–2007
 Cedric Henderson (basketball, born 1965), American former basketball player, played 1985–1995